Flashman or Flash Man may refer to:

 Harry Flashman, a character in the 1857 novel Tom Brown's School Days by Thomas Hughes
 The Flashman Papers, a series of novels by George MacDonald Fraser based on the Hughes character
 Flashman (novel), a 1969 novel by Fraser and the first of the Flashman Papers series
 Flashman (film), a 1967 Italian film
 Choushinsei Flashman, a Japanese television series and the 10th Super Sentai series
 Flash Man, an enemy in the video game Mega Man 2
 Flashman, a British group formed by Gerald Masters, Nick Walpole and Chris Hudman; and their 1977 debut album
 Ann Flora Froude Flashman (1911–1969), Australian veterinarian